The 2013–14 Florida A&M Rattlers basketball team represented Florida A&M University during the 2013–14 NCAA Division I men's basketball season. The Rattlers, led by third year head coach Clemon Johnson, played their home games at the Teaching Gym and were members of the Mid-Eastern Athletic Conference. They finished the season 14–18, 8–8 in MEAC play to finish in sixth place. They advanced to the quarterfinals of the MEAC tournament where they lost to Morgan State.

At the end of the season, head coach Clemon Johnson was fired. He posted a three year record of 32–64.

Roster

Schedule

|-
!colspan=9 style="background:#008000; color:#FFA500;"|  Regular season

|-
!colspan=9 style="background:#008000; color:#FFA500;"| MEAC tournament

References

Florida A&M Rattlers basketball seasons
Florida A and M